Bo Larsson (born 1944) is a Swedish former footballer.

Bo Larsson may also refer to:
 Bo Larsson (ice hockey) (born 1956), Swedish ice hockey player
 Bo Larsson (water polo) (1927–1977), Swedish water polo player 
 Bo Christian Larsson (born 1976), Swedish artist
 Bosse Larsson (Bo Einar Larsson, 1934–2015), Swedish television presenter